The Soul Seekers is an American gospel music group signed to RCA Inspiration, through their affiliation with GospoCentric Records. The group consist of nine members, who are the following; Charlie Bereal, Craig Brockman, Johnteris Tate, Warryn Campbell, Teddy Campbell, Gerald Haddon, Eric Seats, John "Jubu" Smith, and Nisan Stewart. In September 2000, the group started with a performance at Stewart's fathers church in Los Angeles that's Greater Emmanuel Temple Church. The first album came out in 2005, with GospoCentric and My Block Records, The Soul Seekers, and this would chart on the Billboard Gospel Albums chart. Their follow-up album released in 2010, Soul Seekers II, which charted on the aforementioned chart, along with the Heatseekers Albums chart.

Background
The Los Angeles, California-based gospel group, The Soul Seekers started in 2000, with some spontaneously improvised performances at Greater Emmanuel Temple Church, where Nisan Stewart's father was the pastor and bishop, Carl Stewart. These performances would become an annual tradition for the community, and those were called "'Take Me Back Night'" concerts. This group has eight members; Charlie Bereal, Craig Brockman, Teddy Campbell, Warryn Campbell, Gerald Haddon, Eric Seats, John "Jubu" Smith, and Nisan Stewart.

Music history
Even though, the group got its start in September 2000, it was not until, April 19, 2005, that they released their debut studio album with GospoCentric Records and My Block Records, The Soul Seekers. This album would succeed in charting on the Billboard Gospel Albums at No. 37. Their second studio album released on November 16, 2010, Soul Seekers II, this time with My Block and Sovereign Records. The album would again chart on the Gospel Albums chart, but this time higher at No. 11, while it also charted on the Heatseekers Albums at No. 12. This album would receive a three star review from AllMusic's William Ruhlmann, yet it would get a seven out of ten review by Cross Rhythms' Donna Marshall.

Members
 Teddy Campbell – lead vocals
 Warryn Campbell – bass guitar and vocals
 Nisan Stewart – founder and vocals
 Gerald Haddon – vocals
 John "Jubu" Smith – guitar and vocals
 Charlie Bereal – guitar
 Eric Seats – drums
 Craig Brockman – organ

Discography

References

Musical groups established in 2000